William L. Nelson was an American wrestler who competed in the 1904 Summer Olympics. At the 1904 Summer Olympics, he won the bronze medal in the freestyle wrestling flyweight class.

References

External links
 

Year of birth missing
Year of death missing
Wrestlers at the 1904 Summer Olympics
American male sport wrestlers
Olympic bronze medalists for the United States in wrestling
Medalists at the 1904 Summer Olympics
20th-century American people